The Stranger's Hand (Italian: La mano dello straniero) is a 1954 British-Italian thriller drama film directed by Mario Soldati and starring Trevor Howard, Alida Valli and Richard Basehart. An international co-production, it is based on the draft novel with the same name written by Graham Greene. The plot follows the son of a British MI5 agent kidnapped in Venice by agents of Yugoslavia as he searches for his father.

The first two chapters of The Stranger's Hand had been entered by Greene anonymously under a pseudonym to a competition in the New Statesman to write a book in the style of Graham Greene – a competition in which Greene was amused to win second prize. Soldati had seen the chapters and persuaded Greene to complete the novella to make the basis for a film. Greene expanded it to 30 pages of a "film story", on which Giorgio Bassani and Guy Elmes completed the screenplay.

Cast
 Trevor Howard as  Major Roger Court 
 Alida Valli as  Roberta Gleukovitch 
 Richard Basehart as  Joe Hamstringer 
 Richard O'Sullivan as  Roger Court 
 Eduardo Ciannelli as  Dr. Vivaldi  
 Arnoldo Foà as  Commissioner 
 Stephen Murray as  British Consul in Venice
 Guido Celano as  Chief Constable  
 Nerio Bernardi as  Vincenzo
 Giorgio Costantini as 	Pescovitch
 Angelo Cecchelin as Luza
 Nino Vechina as 	First Killer
 Armando Papette as 	Second Killer
 Giovanni Karuz as Third Killer
 Joan Butterfield as 	Mrs. Harrington
 Alessandro Paulon as Morgan
 Remington Olmsted as 	Ramondo

References

Bibliography
 Spicer, Andrew. Historical Dictionary of Film Noir. Scarecrow Press, 2010.

External links

.

1954 films
1950s thriller drama films
Films directed by Mario Soldati
Films scored by Nino Rota
Films based on works by Graham Greene
British thriller drama films
Films produced by Angelo Rizzoli
Novels by Graham Greene
Films shot in Venice
1950 British novels
Italian thriller drama films
1954 drama films
Films scored by Alessandro Cicognini
English-language Italian films
1950s Italian-language films
British black-and-white films
Italian black-and-white films
British Lion Films films
1950s English-language films
1950s British films
1950s Italian films